The 1922 United States Senate election in Montana took place on November 7, 1922. Incumbent United States Senator Henry L. Myers, who was first elected to the Senate in 1910, and was re-elected in 1916, declined to seek re-election. Former United States Attorney Burton K. Wheeler won the Democratic primary and advanced to the general election, where he faced Carl W. Riddick, the United States Congressman from Montana's 2nd congressional district and the Republican nominee. Ultimately, Wheeler defeated Riddick comfortably and won his first term in the Senate.

Democratic primary

Candidates
Burton K. Wheeler, 1920 Democratic nominee for Governor of Montana, former United States Attorney for the District of Montana, former State Representative
Tom Stout, former United States Congressman from Montana's at-large congressional district
James F. O'Connor, former Speaker of the Montana House of Representatives
Hugh R. Wells, former State Representative, former Chairman of the Montana Democratic Party

Results

Republican primary

Candidates
Carl W. Riddick, United States Congressman from Montana's 2nd congressional district
Wellington D. Rankin, Attorney General of Montana
Charles Nelson Pray, former United States Congressman from Montana's at-large congressional district, 1916 Republican nominee for the United States Senate
J. W. Anderson
J. C. F. Siegfriedt, mining company doctor

Results

General election

Results

References

Montana
1922
1922 Montana elections